WeRecoverData is a privately owned data recovery corporation with headquarters in New York City. The company maintains a clean-room and data forensics lab.

In addition to standard data recovery, WeRecoverData offers remote data recovery through proprietary software, and in extreme cases will perform reverse engineering on the firmware of a drive to retrieve its contents. It can also attempt to recover data from smartphones and other mobile devices.

See also 
 List of data recovery companies

References

Technology companies of the United States
Data recovery companies